Ebrahimabad, also rendered as Ibrahimabad, may refer to:

Alborz Province
Ebrahimabad, Alborz

Ardabil Province
Ebrahimabad-e Ajirlu, a village in Parsabad County
Ebrahimabad-e Jadid, Ardabil, a village in Parsabad County

Fars Province
Ebrahimabad, Firuzabad, a village in Firuzabad County
Ebrahimabad, Marvdasht, a village in Marvdasht County
Ebrahimabad, Sepidan, a village in Sepidan County

Gilan Province
Ebrahimabad, Gilan, a village in Rasht County

Golestan Province
Ebrahimabad, Bandar-e Gaz, a village in Bandar-e Gaz County
Ebrahimabad, Gorgan, a village in Gorgan County

Hamadan Province
Ebrahimabad, Hamadan, a village in Famenin County

Isfahan Province
Ebrahimabad, Isfahan, a village in Khur and Biabanak County

Kerman Province

Arzuiyeh County
Ebrahimabad, Arzuiyeh, a village in Arzuiyeh County
Ebrahimabad, Vakilabad, a village in Arzuiyeh County

Bardsir County

Fahraj County
Ebrahimabad 1, a village in Fahraj County
Ebrahimabad 2, a village in Fahraj County
Ebrahimabad-e Deh Gavi, a village in Fahraj County
Ebrahimabad-e Jadid, Kerman, a village in Fahraj County

Jiroft County
Ebrahimabad, Jiroft, a village in Jiroft County

Kerman County
Ebrahimabad, Shahdad, a village in Kerman County

Narmashir County
Ebrahimabad, Narmashir, a village in Narmashir County
Ebrahimabad, Rud Ab, a village in Narmashir County

Rabor County
Ebrahimabad, Rabor, a village in Rabor County

Rafsanjan County
Ebrahimabad-e Hajji, a village in Rafsanjan County
Ebrahimabad-e Shur, a village in Rafsanjan County

Shahr-e Babak County
Ebrahimabad, Shahr-e Babak, a village in Shahr-e Babak County

Sirjan County
Ebrahimabad, Sirjan, a village in Sirjan County
Ebrahimabad, Zeydabad, a village in Sirjan County

Zarand County
Ebrahimabad, Vahdat, a village in Zarand County

Khuzestan Province
Ebrahimabad, Khuzestan

Kurdistan Province
Ebrahimabad, Bijar, a village in Bijar County
Ebrahimabad, Dehgolan, a village in Dehgolan County
Ebrahimabad, Divandarreh, a village in Divandarreh County
Ebrahimabad-e Olya va Sofla, a village in Divandarreh County
Ebrahimabad, Kamyaran, a village in Kamyaran County
Ebrahimabad, Sarvabad, a village in Sarvabad County

Lorestan Province
Ebrahimabad, Lorestan
Ebrahimabad, alternate name of Rahimabad-e Yek, Lorestan Province

Markazi Province
Ebrahimabad, Mashhad-e Miqan, a village in Arak County
Ebrahimabad, Moshkabad, a village in Arak County
Ebrahimabad, Khondab, a village in Khondab County
Ebrahimabad, Saveh, a village in Saveh County
Ebrahimabad, Zarandieh, a village in Zarandieh County

Qazvin Province
Ebrahimabad, Abyek, Qazvin
Ebrahimabad, Basharyat, Qazvin
Ebrahimabad, Buin Zahra, Qazvin
Ebrahimabad Rural District

Razavi Khorasan Province
Ebrahimabad, Bajestan, a village in Bajestan County
Ebrahimabad, Bardaskan, a village in Bardaskan County
Ebrahimabad, Chenaran, a village in Chenaran County
Ebrahimabad, Firuzeh, a village in Firuzeh County
Ebrahimabad Abu Talab, a village in Jowayin County
Ebrahimabad-e Bala Jowayin, a village in Jowayin County
Ebrahimabad, Khalilabad, a village in Khalilabad County
Ebrahimabad, Khoshab, a village in Khoshab County
Ebrahimabad, Mashhad, a village in Mashhad County
Ebrahimabad, Nishapur, a village in Nishapur County
Ebrahimabad, Zeberkhan, a village in Nishapur County
Ebrahimabad-e Muri, a village in Nishapur County
Ebrahimabad, Rashtkhvar, a village in Rashtkhvar County
Ebrahimabad, Sabzevar, a village in Sabzevar County
Ebrahimabad, Sarakhs, a village in Sarakhs County
Ebrahimabad, Torbat-e Jam, a village in Torbat-e Jam County

Semnan Province
Ebrahimabad-e Olya, a village in Shahrud County
Ebrahimabad-e Sofla, a village in Shahrud County

Sistan and Baluchestan Province
Ebrahimabad, Hirmand, a village in Hirmand County
Ebrahimabad (28°22′ N 60°28′ E), Khash, a village in Khash County

South Khorasan Province
Ebrahimabad, Darmian, a village in Darmian County
Ebrahimabad, Ferdows, a village in Ferdows County
Ebrahimabad, Nehbandan, a village in Nehbandan County
Ebrahimabad, Shusef, a village in Nehbandan County
Ebrahimabad, Qaen, a village in Qaen County
Ebrahimabad, Sarbisheh, a village in Sarbisheh County
Ebrahimabad, Tabas, a village in Tabas County
Ebrahimabad-e Bala, a village in Tabas County
Ebrahimabad-e Pain, a village in Tabas County

Tehran Province
Ebrahimabad, Tehran, a village in Pakdasht County
Ebrahimabad, Malard, a village in Malard County
Ebrahimabad, Pishva, a village in Pishva County
Ebrahimabad, Rey, a village in Rey County
Ebrahimabad, Shahriar, a village in Shahriar County
Ebrahimabad, Varamin, a village in Varamin County

West Azerbaijan Province
Ebrahimabad, West Azerbaijan, a village in Miandoab County
Ebrahimabad, Sardasht, a village in Sardasht County

Yazd Province

Ashkezar County
Ebrahimabad, Ashkezar, a village in Ashkezar County

Mehriz County
Ebrahimabad, Mehriz, a village in Mehriz County
Ebrahimabad-e Cheshmeh Nazer, a village in Mehriz County

Taft County
Ebrahimabad, Taft, a village in Taft County
Ebrahimabad, Garizat, a village in Taft County
Ebrahimabad, alternate name of Mir Hashem, a village in Taft County
Ebrahimabad (31°25′ N 54°17′ E), Zardeyn, a village in Taft County

Zanjan Province
Ebrahimabad, Khodabandeh, a village in Khodabandeh County
Ebrahimabad, Mahneshan, a village in Mahneshan County
Ebrahimabad, Zanjan, a village in Zanjan County
Ebrahimabad, Zanjanrud, a village in Zanjan County